Shari Mari (also Romanized as Sharī Marī and Sherī Merī) is a village in Anaqcheh Rural District, in the Central District of Ahvaz County, Khuzestan Province, Iran. At the 2006 census, its population was 571, in 110 families.

References 

Populated places in Ahvaz County